Classique des Alpes was a classic taking place as a mountainous single-day cycling race. It took place in Chartreuse Mountains, beginning in Chambéry and finishing in Aix-les-Bains.

It was held between 1991 and 2004, a day before the start of the Critérium du Dauphiné Libéré. Following the 2004 edition, Jean-Marie Leblanc, head of the organising body the Amaury Sport Organisation, announced the race would no longer take place as the cycling teams were not supportive of the race. Charly Mottet, the first winner of the race, said that the race would have been more successful in August, following the Tour de France, as the climbing specialists would have been in form.

In 1995, a junior version of the Classique des Alpes was organised, which was continued after the senior version was cancelled.

Elite race winners

Junior race winners

References

External links 

Classic cycle races
Cycle races in France
Recurring sporting events established in 1991
1991 establishments in France
Recurring sporting events disestablished in 2004
Defunct cycling races in France
Sport in Savoie
2004 disestablishments in France